The 2007–08 Miami Hurricanes men's basketball team represented the University of Miami during the 2007–08 NCAA Division I men's basketball season. The Hurricanes, led by 4th-year head coach Frank Haith, played their home games at the BankUnited Center and are members of the Atlantic Coast Conference. They finished the season 23–11, 8–8 in ACC play to finish in a three-way tie for fourth place. They lost in the quarterfinals of the ACC Basketball tournament to Florida State. They were invited to the 2008 NCAA tournament as No. 7 seed in the South region. They defeated St. Mary's in the first round before falling in the second round to Texas.

Roster

Schedule

|-
!colspan=12 style=| Non-conference Regular Season

|-
!colspan=12 style=| ACC Regular Season

|-
!colspan=12 style=| ACC tournament

|-
!colspan=12 style=| NCAA tournament

Rankings

References

Miami Hurricanes men's basketball seasons
Miami Hurricanes
Miami Hurricanes men's basketball team
Miami Hurricanes men's basketball team
Miami Hurricanes